The 14th Television State Awards festival (Sinhala: 14 වැනි රූපවාහිනී රාජ්‍ය සම්මාන උලෙළ), was held to honor the television programs of 2018 Sinhala television on November 21, 2019, at the Nelum Pokuna Mahinda Rajapaksa Theatre, Colombo 07, Sri Lanka. The event was organized by the State Television Advisory Council, Arts Council of Sri Lanka, Department of Cultural Affairs, Ministry of Housing and Cultural Affairs. Ravindra Randeniya and Malini Fonseka were attended as the Chief Guests.

At the award ceremony, Dr. Lalitha Siribandhana (Sinhala Medium) and Mr. S. Vishwanathan (Tamil Medium) received the Lifetime Achievement Award.

Awards

Media Section

Television Serial Section

See also
 7th Sri Lankan Television State Awards

References

Sri Lankan Television State Awards
Sri Lankan Television State Awards